Waterfront Beat is a BBC television police procedural drama series, broadcast between 6 January 1990 and 20 February 1991. The series follows the work of a group of police detectives stationed in the Liverpool docks. The series was created by writer Phil Redmond, famed for his work on Channel 4 soap Brookside. The series was highly regarded as the BBC's first attempt to rival The Bill, following a similar weekly format to the ITV counterpart. A total of sixteen episodes were broadcast over the course of two series. The programme featured a large ensemble cast, with John Ashton, Rupert Frazer, Geoffrey Leesley, Denis Lill and Brian McCardie leading the cast throughout both series.

BBC executives stated that the series would "look at the way one non-metropolitan, urban police force comes to terms with economic regeneration by reorganising its City Division, in turn creating a separate Inner City Waterfront Division", and that the series would explore "aspects of police work not normally featured and disabuse us of the notion that TV crime is always cracked in 50 minutes." However, despite initial acclaim, Waterfront Beat was axed after just two series. The series has never officially been released on DVD.

Cast
 John Ashton as Detective Chief Supt. Don Henderson (Series 1—2)
 Geoffrey Leesley as Det. Supt. Frank Mathews (Series 1—2)
 Bruce Alexander as Chief Supt. Alan Briscoe (Series 1—2)
 Rupert Frazer as Supt. Peter Fallows (Series 1—2)
 Denis Lill as Assistant Chief Constable Williams (Series 1—2)
 Roger Walker as DI Cyril Jacobs (Series 2)
 Mark Moraghan as DS 'Macker' McVay (Series 1—2)
 Owen Teale as DS Mike McCarthy (Series 1)
 Eve Bland as WDS Jackie Byrnes (Series 1—2)
 Helena Little as WDC Jane Long (Series 1—2)
 Stuart Golland as Sgt. Trevor Simon (Series 1—2)
 Brian McCardie as PC Ronnie Barker (Series 1—2)
 Gordon Cameron as PC Jeff Morgan (Series 1—2)
 Ray Polhill as PC 'Jacko' Jackbridge (Series 1—2)
 Philip Middlemiss as PC Barry Smith (Series 1)
 Richard Good as PC Bob 'Snake' Nelson (Series 2)
 Jane Hazlegrove as WPC Madeline Forrest (Series 1—2)
 Damien Walker as Tony Henderson (Series 1—2)
 Tommy Boyle as Denny Hagland (Series 1—2)
 Martin Matthews as Brian Dawes (Series 1—2)
 Denise Stephenson as June Henderson (Series 1)
 Gillian Kearney as Helen Collins (Series 2)

Episodes

Series 1 (1990)

Series 2 (1991)

References

External links

1990 British television series debuts
1991 British television series endings
1990s British police procedural television series
BBC television dramas
English-language television shows
Television shows shot in Liverpool
Television shows set in Liverpool